Ryanoids are a class of insecticides which share the same mechanism of action as the alkaloid ryanodine.  Ryanodine is a naturally occurring insecticide isolated from Ryania speciosa.

Ryanoids include natural chemicals which are closely related to ryanodine, such as ryanodol and 9,21-didehydroryanodol, and also chemically distinct synthetic compounds such as chlorantraniliprole (Rynaxypyr), flubendiamide, cyantraniliprole, cyclaniliprole, and tetraniliprole, which are called diamide insecticides.

Ryanoids exert their insecticidal effect by interacting with ryanodine receptors, a type of calcium channel.  This causes loss of muscle function leading to paralysis and death.

References

Insecticides